Mark Dennis may refer to:
 Mark Dennis (director), American director, editor, producer and composer
 Mark Dennis (footballer), English former footballer
 Mark Dennis (American football), American football offensive tackle